There were three female and 39 male athletes representing the country at the 2000 Summer Paralympics.
As host of 2004 edition in Athens, a Greek segment was featured on closing ceremony.

Medalists

See also
2000 Summer Paralympics
Greece at the Paralympics

References

Bibliography

External links
International Paralympic Committee

Nations at the 2000 Summer Paralympics
Paralympics
2000